Baraka Pakao is a settlement in Senegal.

External links
PEPAM

References

Populated places in Senegal